The Kalyan Minaret (Persian/Tajik: Minâra-i Kalân, Kalon Minor, Kalon Minaret) is a minaret of the Po-i-Kalyan mosque complex in Bukhara, Uzbekistan and one of the most prominent landmarks in the city.

The minaret, designed by Bako, was built on an earlier existing structure called Kalyan by the Qarakhanid ruler Mohammad Arslan Khan in 1127 to summon Muslims to prayer five times a day. An earlier tower was collapsed before starting this structure which was called Kalyan, meaning welfare, indicating a Buddhist or zoroasterian past. 
It is made in the form of a circular-pillar baked brick tower, narrowing upwards.

There is a brick spiral staircase that twists up inside around the pillar to the rotunda. The tower base has narrow ornamental strings belted across it made of bricks which are placed in both straight or diagonal fashion. The frieze is covered with a blue glaze with inscriptions.

In times of war, warriors used the minaret as a watchtower to lookout for enemies.

About a hundred years after its construction, the tower so impressed Genghis Khan that he ordered it to be spared when all around was destroyed by his men. It is also known as the Tower of Death, because until as recently as the early twentieth century criminals were executed by being thrown from the top. Fitzroy Maclean, who made a surreptitious visit to the city in 1938, says in his memoir Eastern Approaches, "For centuries before 1870, and again in the troubled years between 1917 and 1920, men were cast down to their death from the delicately ornamented gallery which crowns it."

History 
According to some historical sources, before the construction of the Kalyan Minaret in its place was another minaret, a smaller one, which later fell, and in its place it was decided to build the current one.

The minaret was built in 1127 (XII century), when Bukhara was part of the Karakhanid state. The initiator of the construction was the ruler from the Karakhanid dynasty - , who was known for his urban development. His name as the initiator of the construction is carved on one of the belts of the minaret. In the will of the architect it was said that the minaret, if it falls, fell on his head, and bequeathed him to bury it in the place indicated by him. According to legend, the master builder, who laid the foundation of the minaret from alabaster and camel milk, disappeared, but returned only two years later, when the foundation became durable, and proceeded to the brickwork.

At one time, the minaret performed several functions. It was also used to call the population in the nearest area to read decrees of rulers and other occasions.

In 1924, a small part of the wall and the minaret's muqarnases were restored. In 1960, by the founding by Ochil Bobomurodov, the underground part of the minaret was repaired and reinforced, where the foundation and the foundation of the minaret are located. In 1997, to the 2500th anniversary of Bukhara, the minaret was thoroughly reconstructed and restored by the best masters. In subsequent years, the minaret also carried out small restoration works.

Gallery

See also
List of tallest structures built before the 20th century

References

Buildings and structures in Bukhara
Towers in Uzbekistan
Towers completed in the 12th century
Buildings and structures completed in 1127
History of Bukhara
Minarets